Kopsia sleesiana is a species of plant in the family Apocynaceae. It is endemic to the Sarawak region of Malaysia, on the island of Borneo.

References

sleesiana
Endemic flora of Borneo
Flora of Sarawak
Plants described in 1973
Vulnerable plants
Taxonomy articles created by Polbot